Porky's Midnight Matinee is a Warner Bros. Looney Tunes cartoon directed by Chuck Jones. The short was released on November 22, 1941, and stars Porky Pig.

Plot
Porky is working backstage flipping switches and things while singing and whistling "You Ought to be in Pictures", but he is stopped by a "PSST". It came from an African pygmy ant in a cage and he wants Porky to let him out. So Porky open the cage door and did let him out. When the ant goes out, he makes a dash for it. Porky who spun and fell because of the dashing ant looks at the bottom of the cage and is surprised by the price of the ant, $162,422,503.51 (equivalent to $3,106,446,395.70 in 2022).  Porky then sees the ant on a rope and runs after him, but he trips over a trunk and falls into it. He emerges from the trunk wearing a magician's hat and takes it off only to find that a magic rabbit is sitting on his head. The ant mocks and laughs at Porky's misfortune. Eventually, the rabbit comes off of Porky's head, he put on his work hat back on and ran upstairs.

The ant sees Porky coming and swing onto a platform. The ant then walks on a high wire with Porky right on his tail. The ant stops Porky and shows him what's down below, indicating that Porky's high up. Porky nervously tries to walk back to the platform, but the ant wiggles and jiggles that wire and causes Porky to fall down. The ant then slides down a rope, reaches the bottom and spots a table full of food. So he decides to go there. First the ant jumps up & down on a sandwich, falls into the bread, takes a piece of it and eats it. Porky just caught up with the ant and attempts squish him by slamming his hand down on the sandwich, but he got away. He then finds the ant on a jar of mustard and sticks his hand in there. But again, the ant escapes. The ant while sitting on a soda bottle then showed Porky how to remove his hand from the jar, which is to smash it on the table. Porky succeeds, but his hand is covered in mustard and sticks it to his mouth. The ant then gave Porky a bottle of turpentine to drink. This may be an attempt to kill Porky as the ant then shows Porky a lighted match. But Porky was no fool. He attempts to catch the ant by diving onto the table, but all he got is raining food and meat on his head. Porky then decides to lure the ant out of hiding by holding a stick of candy cane for the ant. The ant took the bait, but he switches the candy for a stick of dynamite. Porky throws the stick of dynamite and it pushes away the candy. Porky tries to warn the ant about the dynamite, but the latter doesn't listen, he just lies there on the dynamite. Porky hides as the dynamite explodes, but it didn't blow the ant up. Instead it took the ant back to his cage. Porky smiles now that the ant is back where he belongs and the now scorched black ant smiles too as the cartoon ends.

Cast 
Mel Blanc as Porky Pig

Home media
Porky's Midnight Matinee was released, uncut and restored, on Porky Pig 101, Disc 5.

See also 
 Looney Tunes and Merrie Melodies filmography (1940–49)

References

External links 
 
 

1941 films
1941 animated films
American black-and-white films
Short films directed by Chuck Jones
Looney Tunes shorts
1940s American animated films
Porky Pig films
Films scored by Carl Stalling
Animated films about animals
Animated films about insects
Fictional ants
1940s English-language films